Ioanna Chydirioti (born 15 April 1997) is a Greek water polo player for Olympiacos and the Greece women's national water polo team.

She participated at the 2018 Women's European Water Polo Championship.

References

1997 births
Living people
Greek female water polo players
Olympiacos Women's Water Polo Team players
Mediterranean Games medalists in water polo
Mediterranean Games bronze medalists for Greece
Competitors at the 2018 Mediterranean Games
21st-century Greek women